Delta Broadcasting System, Inc. (DBS) is a media company owned by El Shaddai leader Bro. Mike Velarde. Its studios and offices at the Queensway Commercial Center Building, 118 Amorsolo Street, Legaspi Village, Makati. It registered at the Securities and Exchange Commission on March 2, 1992. It operates DWXI 1314 kHz AM, an AM radio station which is started in 1981,  and DBS TV Channel 35, a UHF television station.

History
In 1981, at the height of his real estate business expansion around what is now Ninoy Aquino International Airport, Bro. Mike bought the DWXI 1314 an AM Radio Station from its owner-operators for ₱ 2 million, because he needed the parcel of land on which it stood. Besides, the owners would not sell the land unless the radio station was included in the deal. Later, the radio station alone would cost him millions more to sustain its operations.

In 1995, DBS TV was launched on VHF Channel 11. It shows religious TV Shows, including El Shaddai. In 1998, ZOE Broadcasting Network, through its head Jesus is Lord leader Eddie Villanueva, bought Channel 11 and DBS TV moved to UHF Channel 35. Around 2004, it ceased broadcasting due to poor ratings & lack of funds; radio broadcasts of the movement's activities continued on DWXI-AM, however.

On September 15, 2012, during the Weekly Family Appointment with El Shaddai at Amvel City, Bro. Mike announced to the audience and to its listeners and viewers that DBS granted its TV equipment for DBS TV's comeback as early as possible. On July 14, 2016, DBS TV-35 resumed its operations as a test broadcast. As of this moment, it only operates on weak signal and can be picked up by some Cavite, Laguna, Batangas and southern Metro Manila viewers by airing the previous Family Appointment with El Shaddai. On December 4, 2016, during the 28th Anniversary of El Shaddai DWXI PPFI Hong Kong Chapter, Bro. Mike announced that by January 2017, this television station was supposed to be officially back on the air, but it discontinued due to lack of facilities of its station's studios and transmitter. On April 30, 2019, during the Tuesday Family Appointment with El Shaddai, Bro. Mike announced that this channel will be operate in full digital terrestrial television (DTT) via TVplus as the renewal of franchise is approved already by the Philippine Congress. On April 17, 2019, the Philippine Congress passed the Republic Act No. 11303 known as "An Act Renewing for Another Twenty-five (25) Years the Franchise Granted to the Delta Broadcasting System, Inc. to Establish, Maintain and Operate the Radio and Television Broadcasting Stations within the Philippines Under Republic Act No. 7723" signed by President Rodrigo Duterte. That means, DBS has fully maintain and operate the radio and TV broadcast stations within the Philippines.

DBS stations

Free TV

Digital

Radio stations

References

External links

Delta Broadcasting System, Inc. on Asiawaves
DBS on KBP site

Senate oks renewed franchise for Mike Velarde's network

Christian radio stations in the Philippines
Philippine radio networks
Christian mass media companies
Mass media companies established in 1981
Radio stations established in 1981
1981 establishments in the Philippines
Television channels and stations established in 1995
1995 establishments in the Philippines
2004 disestablishments in the Philippines
Television channels and stations disestablished in 2004
Companies based in Makati
Religious television stations in the Philippines